Eurobodalla National Park is a non-contiguous national park in New South Wales, Australia, 268 km southwest of Sydney spanning from Moruya Heads to Tilba Tilba Lake, 12 km south of Narooma.  The park forms part of the Ulladulla to Merimbula Important Bird Area, identified as such by BirdLife International because of its importance for swift parrots.

Fauna 
131 species of birds have been recorded in the park. Many migratory birds use the coastal, estuarine and freshwater habitats of Eurobodalla National Park including the Far Eastern curlew, Eurasian whimbrel, greenshank, turnstone and bar-tailed godwit. Endangered species in the park include the long-nosed potoroo, white-footed dunnart, little tern and hooded plover.

Features 
Significant sites within the park are:
Wreck of the SS Monaro
 Pilot station, South Head Moruya
Toragy Point cemetery
Wreck of the Kameruka

See also
 Protected areas of New South Wales

References

External links 
 NSW National Parks and Wildlife Service web page

National parks of New South Wales
South Coast (New South Wales)
Protected areas established in 1995
1995 establishments in Australia
Important Bird Areas of New South Wales